St. Thomas Episcopal Church, and variations with St. Thomas' or St. Thomas's, may refer to:

In the United States (by state):
 St. Thomas Episcopal Church (Alamosa, Colorado)
 St. Thomas Episcopal Church (Denver, Colorado), a Denver Landmark
 St. Thomas Episcopal Church (Newark, Delaware)
 St. Thomas Episcopal Church (Sioux City, Iowa)
 St. Thomas Episcopal Church (Beattyville, Kentucky)
 St. Thomas Episcopal Church (Taunton, Massachusetts)
 St. Thomas Episcopal Church (Dover, New Hampshire)
 St. Thomas Episcopal Church (Glassboro, New Jersey)
 St. Thomas Episcopal Church (Pittstown, New Jersey)
 St. Thomas Episcopal Church (Amenia Union, New York)
 St. Thomas' Episcopal Church Complex (Mamaroneck, New York)
 St. Thomas Episcopal Church (New Windsor, New York)
 Saint Thomas Church (Manhattan), New York City, New York, an Episcopal church
 St. Thomas Episcopal Church (Slaterville Springs, New York)
 St. Thomas Episcopal Church (Bath, North Carolina)
 St. Thomas Episcopal Church (Port Clinton, Ohio)
 St. Thomas Episcopal Church (Terrace Park, Ohio)
 St. Thomas' Episcopal Church (Canyon City, Oregon)
 African Episcopal Church of St. Thomas, Philadelphia, Pennsylvania
 St. Thomas Episcopal Church (Middletown, Virginia)
 St. Thomas’ Episcopal Church, Whitemarsh

See also
 St. Thomas' Church (disambiguation)